Sokles was an ancient Greek potter, active in the middle of the 6th century BC, in Athens.
The following signed Little-master cups or fragments thereof are known, all of them painted by the Sokles Painter:
Berlin, Antikensammlung F 1781
Bolligen, Collection Rolf Blatter
Daskyleion, Excavation E 108.107
Madrid, Museo Arqueologico Nacional 10947 (L 56)
Malibu (CA), J. Paul Getty Museum 86.AE.158
Oxford, Ashmolean Museum 1929.498
Switzerland, private collection
Taranto, Museo Archeologico Nazionale 20910

He belongs to the group of so-called Little masters.
A red-figure plate in Paris, Louvre CA 2181, painted in style similar to that of the painter Paseas, is signed by a potter named Soklees. Whether that craftsman is identical with the black-figure potter Sokles remains unclear. The signature may also not be authentic.

Bibliography 
John Beazley: Attic Black-Figure Vase-Painters, Oxford 1956, p. 172.
John Beazley: Attic Red-figure Vase-painters, 2nd ed. Oxford 1963, p. 164.
John Beazley: Paralipomena. Additions to Attic black-figure vase-painters and to Attic red-figure vase-painters, Oxford 1971, p. 72.
Kutalmış Görkay: "Attic Black-Figure Pottery from Daskyleion, in: Studien zum antiken Kleinasien IV, Asia Minor Studien 34, Bonn 1999, Pl. 5, 47.
Rolf Blatter: Sokles'', in: Künstlerlexikon der Antike Vol. 2, 2004, p. 404.

Ancient Greek potters